Paphiopedilum primulinum is a species of orchid endemic to Sumatra (southern Aceh).

References

External links 

primulinum
Endemic orchids of Indonesia
Orchids of Sumatra
Plants described in 1973